The Green Party of England and Wales has its roots in the PEOPLE Party started in Coventry in 1972/3 by four professional friends (Michael Benfield, Freda Sanders, Tony Whittaker and Lesley Whittaker). It then changed its name to the more descriptive Ecology Party in 1975, and to the Green Party ten years later.   In the 1990s, the Scottish and Northern Ireland wings of the Green Party in the United Kingdom decided to separate amicably from the party in England and Wales, to form the Scottish Green Party and the Green Party in Northern Ireland. The Wales Green Party became an autonomous regional party and remained within the new Green Party of England and Wales.

1990 to 1997
In 1991 Green Party spokesman and TV sports presenter David Icke created considerable embarrassment for the Party when he revealed his extreme political and spiritual beliefs. He was subsequently forced to leave the party.

Internal divisions over the direction of the party in the early 1990s meant that the Green Party fell out of the limelight and failed to maintain its electoral momentum . In 1991, attempts to streamline the Party Constitution were proposed by a group called Green 2000, who wanted to "modernise" the Party and make it into an organised electoral force that could become the ruling party in the UK by the year 2000. After the Green 2000 Constitution was adopted, a new Executive came into force to oversee the day-to-day business of the party. Many Green 2000 members were elected to the new Executive in 1991 but, by 1992, only two remained, with the others resigning or being recalled and forced to quit. These internal constitutional wranglings, and negative public statements released by supporters of both Green 2000 and decentralists who ran the recall campaigns, seriously hampered preparations for the 1992 General Election, in which 253 Green candidates received 1.3% of the vote. Sara Parkin and Jonathon Porritt left active involvement with the party.

The early and mid-1990s were difficult for the Greens, because of Britain's first-past-the-post electoral system, the recession of 1992–93 and the squeeze caused by the rising popularity of New Labour. Nevertheless, the party gained a handful of local councillors in Stroud and Oxford.

In the 1992 General Election, Cynog Dafis was elected on a Plaid Cymru–Wales Green Party ticket, gaining Ceredigion and Pembroke North from the Liberal Democrats. The Green Party argued that this made him the first Green representative in the House of Commons. The electoral agreement that enabled this broke down by 1995.

1997 to 2009

The election of a Labour government in 1997 created opportunities and focus for the Green Party. New democratic institutions were created that offered electoral possibilities for the Greens, such as the London Assembly, the National Assembly for Wales and – for the independent Scottish Green Party – the Scottish Parliament, all of which use some form of proportional representation, allowing smaller parties the chance of gaining representation. Labour also changed European Parliamentary elections to a form of proportional representation.

Combined with gradual council gains, the party quietly gained successes.

In the 1999 European elections, two Greens were elected Members of the European Parliament (MEPs): Caroline Lucas (South East England) and Jean Lambert (London). They retained their seats in the 2004 European elections, despite a reduction in number of seats available. Overall, the Party gained 1,033,093 votes in the 2004 European election.

However the Greens did not manage to break through into other European electoral regions or the Welsh Assembly.
Three Greens were elected to the first London Assembly.

The Green Party achieved its best ever UK general election result to date in the 2005 general election with a total of 281,780 votes, with Keith Taylor receiving 22% of the vote in Brighton Pavilion.

In 2006 members of the Green Party of England and Wales launched the Green Left grouping within the party.

The Party had 116 local councillors after a gain of 5 councillors during the 2008 local elections. The Greens achieved significant representation on Brighton & Hove City Council, Lancaster City Council, Norwich, Lewisham, Oxford City Council, Oxfordshire County Council, Kirklees Council and Stroud District Council. The Green Party were the official opposition on Norwich City Council; they formed part of the ruling coalition that controlled Lancaster City Council alongside the Liberal Democrats and Labour, and shared control of Castle Morpeth Council as part of an all party administration.

In this period, the Green Party of England and Wales had representation in the House of Lords, the (unelected) upper chamber of Parliament: in the person of  Lord Beaumont of Whitley, who died in 2008.

According to MORI in 2010, Green issues were rated as importantly as during the Green Party's previous high point in the late 1980s.

The party held its first ever leadership election in September 2008: Caroline Lucas was elected to the position of Leader, and Adrian Ramsay to the position of Deputy Leader.

Since 2010
The Green Party fielded more than 300 candidates for the 2010 general election. Caroline Lucas became the first Green candidate to gain a seat in Westminster, after being elected MP for Brighton Pavilion by a margin of 1,252 votes. The following week 600 new members had joined the Green Party bringing total membership to over 11,000. In previous years 600 new members was high for a whole year.

On 24 May 2012, the six Green Party councillors elected to Stroud District Council formed a power sharing administration  (a "constructive cooperation") with both the Labour Party and the Liberal Democrats.

In May 2014, Molly Scott Cato became the party's third MEP.

Election results

General elections

European elections

References and notes

 
Green Party of England and Wales
Green Party